State leaders in the 5th century BC – State leaders in the 3rd century BC – State leaders by year

This is a list of state leaders in the 4th century BC (400–301 BC).

Africa: North

Carthage

Carthage (complete list) –
Didonian
Himilco II, King (406–396 BC)
Mago II, King (396–375 BC)
Mago III, King (375–344 BC)
Hanno III, King (344–340 BC)
Hannonian
Hanno the Great, prince (340–337 BC)
Gisco, King (337–330 BC)
Hamilcar II, King (330–309 BC)
Bomilcar, King (309–308 BC)

Egypt: Late Period

Twenty-eighth Dynasty of the Late Period (complete list) –
Amyrtaeus, Pharaoh (404–398 BC)

Twenty-ninth Dynasty of the Late Period (complete list) –
Nefaarud I, Pharaoh (398–393 BC)
Psammuthes, Pharaoh (393 BC)
Hakor, Pharaoh (393–380 BC)

Thirtieth Dynasty of the Late Period (complete list) –
Nectanebo I, Pharaoh (380–362 BC)
Teos, Pharaoh (362–360 BC)
Nectanebo II, Pharaoh (360–343 BC)

Khabash Revolt of the Second Persian occupation of Egypt (Thirty-first Dynasty) 
Khabash, rebel Pharaoh (c.338–c.335 BC)

Egypt: Ptolemaic Kingdom

Ptolemaic Kingdom of Egypt (complete list) –
Ptolemy I Soter, Pharaoh (305–283/282 BC)

Kush

Kush (complete list) –
Harsiotef, King (404–369 BC)
(unknown Qore), King (369–350 BC)
Akhraten, King (350–335 BC)
Amanibakhi, King (4th century BC)
Nastasen, King (335–315 BC)

Numidia

Numidia: Eastern Numidia (complete list) –
Zelalsen, King (344–274 BC)

Asia

Asia: East

China: Warring States period

Zhou, China: Eastern Zhou (complete list) –
An, King (401–376 BC)
Lie, King (375–369 BC)
Xian, King (368–321 BC)
Shenjing, King (320–315 BC)
Nan, King (314–256 BC)

Chu (complete list) –
Dao, King (401–381 BC)
Su, King (380–370 BC)
Xuan, King (369–340 BC)
Wei, King (339–329 BC)
Huai, King (328–299 BC)

Han (complete list) –
Jing, Marquess (408–400 BC)
Lie, Marquess (399–387 BC)
Wen, Marquess (386–377 BC)
Ai, Marquess (376–374 BC)
Gong, Marquess (374–363 BC)
Xi, Marquess (362–233 BC)
Xuanhui, King (332–312 BC)
Xiang, King (311–296 BC)

Qi: House of Jiang (complete list) –
Kang, Duke (404–386 BC)

Qi: House of Tian (complete list) –
Tai, Duke (404–384 BC)
Tian Yan, Marquess (383–375 BC)
Huan, Duke (374–357 BC)
Wei, King (356–320 BC)
Xuan, King (319–300 BC)
Min, King (300–283 BC)

Qin (complete list) –
Jian, Duke (414–400 BC)
Hui II, Duke (399–387 BC)
Chuzi II, Duke (386–385 BC)
Xian, Duke (384–362 BC)
Xiao, Duke (361–338 BC)
Huiwen, King (337–311 BC)
Wu, King (310–307 BC)
Zhaoxiang, King (306–251 BC)

Wei (complete list) –
Wen, Marquess (445–396 BC)
Wu, Marquess (396–370 BC)
Hui, King (370–319 BC)
Xiang, King (319–296 BC)

Zhao (complete list) –
Lie, Marquess (409–387 BC)
Jing, Marquess (387–375 BC)
Cheng, Marquess (375–350 BC)
Su, Marquess (350–326 BC)
Wuling, King (326–299 BC)

Asia: Southeast
Vietnam
Hồng Bàng dynasty (complete list) –
Hùng Duệ Vương, King (408–258 BC)

Asia: South

India

Magadha: Shishunaga dynasty (complete list) –
Shishunaga, King (413–395 BC)
Kalashoka, King (395–367 BC)
Mahanandin, King (367–345 BC)

Magadha: Nanda dynasty (complete list) –
Mahapadma Nanda, Emperor (c.345–c.329 BC)
Dhana, Emperor (c.329–c.321 BC)

Maurya Empire (complete list) –
Chandragupta, Emperor (324–297 BC)

Sri Lanka

Anuradhapura Kingdom (complete list) –
Pandukabhaya, King (377–367 BC)
Mutasiva, King (367–307 BC)
Devanampiya Tissa, King (307–267 BC)

Kingdom of Upatissa Nuwara (complete list) –
Pandukabhaya, King (437–377 BC)

Asia: West

First Persian Empire: Achaemenid Empire(complete list) –
Artaxerxes II, Great King, Shah (404–358 BC)
Artaxerxes III, Great King, Shah (358–338 BC)
Arses, Great King, Shah (338–336 BC)
Darius III, Great King, Shah (336–330 BC)
Bessus, Great King, Shah (330–329 BC)

Antigonid dynasty (complete list) –
Antigonus I Monophthalmus, King in Syria and Asia Minor (306–301 BC)

Atropatene (complete list) - 
Atropates
Satrap (323 BC-321 BC)
King (c.321 BC)

Kingdom of Bithynia (complete list) –
Bas, Dynast (376–326 BC)
Zipoetes I, Dynast (326–297 BC)

Bosporan Kingdom:Spartocids dynasty (complete list) –
Satyrus I, King (433–389 BC) 
Seleucus, King (433–393 BC)
Leucon I, King (389–349 BC) 
Gorgippus, King (389–349 BC)
Spartacus II, King (349–344 BC) 
Pairisades I, King (349–311 BC)
Satyrus II, King (311–310 BC)
Prytanis, King (310 BC)
Eumelos, King (310–304 BC)
Spartacus III, King (304–284 BC)

Kingdom of Cappadocia (complete list) –
Ariarathes I
Satrap (350–331 BC)
King (331–322 BC)
Ariarathes II, Suzerain King (301–280 BC)

Colchis (complete list) –
Akes, King (late 4th century BC)
Kuji, King (325–280 BC)

Seleucid Empire (complete list) –
Seleucus I Nicator, King (305–281 BC)

Europe

Europe: Balkans

Athens (complete list) –

Xenainetos, Archon (401–400 BC)
Laches, Archon (400–399 BC)
Aristocrates, Archon (399–398 BC)
Euthykles, Archon (398–397 BC)
Souniades, Archon (397–396 BC)
Phormion, Archon (396–395 BC)
Diophandus, Archon (395–394 BC)
Ebulides, Archon (394–393 BC)
Demostratos, Archon (393–392 BC)
Philocles, Archon (392–391 BC)
Nicoteles, Archon (391–390 BC)
Demostratos, Archon (390–389 BC)
Antipatros, Archon (389–388 BC)
Pyrgion, Archon (388–387 BC)
Theodotos, Archon (387–386 BC)
Mystichides, Archon (386–385 BC)
Dexitheus, Archon (385–384 BC)
Dieitrephes, Archon (384–383 BC)
Phanostratos, Archon (383–382 BC)
Euandros, Archon (382–381 BC)
Demophilos, Archon (381–380 BC)

Pytheas, Archon (380–379 BC)
Nikon, Archon (379–378 BC)
Nausinikos, Archon (378–377 BC)
Kalleas, Archon (377–376 BC)
Charisandrus, Archon (376–375 BC)
Hippodamas, Archon (375–374 BC)
Socratides, Archon (374–373 BC)
Asteius, Archon (373–372 BC)
Alcisthenes, Archon (372–371 BC)
Phrasicleides, Archon (371–370 BC)
Dyscinitus, Archon (370–369 BC)
Lysistratus, Archon (369–368 BC)
Nausigenes, Archon (368–367 BC)
Polyzelus, Archon (367–366 BC)
Ciphisodorus, Archon (366–365 BC)
Chion, Archon (365–364 BC)
Timocrates, Archon (364–363 BC)
Charicleides, Archon (363–362 BC)
Molon, Archon (362–361 BC)
Nicophemus, Archon (361–360 BC)
Callimides, Archon (360–359 BC)

Eucharistus, Archon (359–358 BC)
Ciphisodotus, Archon (358–357 BC)
Agathocles, Archon (357–356 BC)
Elpines, Archon (356–355 BC)
Callistratus, Archon (355–354 BC)
Diotemus, Archon (354–353 BC)
Thudemus, Archon (353–352 BC)
Aristodemus, Archon (352–351 BC)
Theellus, Archon (351–350 BC)
Apollodorus, Archon (350–349 BC)
Callimachus, Archon (349–348 BC)
Theophilus, Archon (348–347 BC)
Themistocles, Archon (347–346 BC)
Archias, Archon (346–345 BC)
Ebulus, Archon (345–344 BC)
Lyciscus, Archon (344–343 BC)
Pythodotus, Archon (343–342 BC)
Sosigenes, Archon (342–341 BC)
Nicomachus, Archon (341–340 BC)
Theophrastus, Archon (340–339 BC)
Lysimachides, Archon (339–338 BC)

Epirus (complete list) –
Tharrhypas, King (430–392 BC)
Alcetas I, King (390, 385–370 BC)
Neoptolemos I, King (370–357 BC, 317–313 BC)
Arybbas, King (373–343 BC)
Alexander I, King (342–331 BC)
Aeacides, King (330–317 BC)
Alcetas II, King (313–306 BC)
Pyrrhus I, King (307–302 BC, 297–272 BC)
Neoptolemos II, King (302–297 ВС)

Macedonia: 
Argead dynasty (complete list) –
Archelaus I, King (413–399 BC)
Craterus, King (399 BC)
Orestes, King (399–396 BC)
Aeropus II, King (399–393 BC)
Archelaus II, King (396–393 BC)
Amyntas II, King (393 BC)
Pausanias, King (393 BC)
Argaeus II, King (393–392 BC)
Amyntas III, King (392–370 BC)
Alexander II, King (370–368 BC)
Ptolemy, Regent (368–365 BC)
Perdiccas III, King (368–359 BC)
Amyntas IV, King (359 BC)
Philip II, King (359–336 BC)
Alexander the Great, King (336–323 BC)
Philip III Arrhidaeus, King (323–317 BC)
Alexander IV, King (317–309 BC)
Antipatrid dynasty (complete list) –
Cassander, King (305–297 BC)

Odrysian kingdom of Thrace (complete list) –
Amadocus I, King (408–389 BC) 
Seuthes II, King (405–387 BC)
Hebryzelmis, King (387–383 BC)
Cotys I, King (384–359 BC)
Cersobleptes, King, eastern Thrace (359–341 BC)
Berisades, King, western Thrace (359–352 BC)
Amatokos II, King, middle Thrace (359–351 BC)
Cetriporis, King, western Thrace (356–351 BC)
Teres II,  King, middle Thrace (351–342 BC)
Seuthes III, King (331–300 BC)

Paeonia (complete list) –
Agis, King (?–359 BC)
Lycceius, King (356–340 BC)
Patraus, King (340–315 BC)
Audoleon, King (315–285 BC)

Sparta 
Eurypontid dynasty (complete list) –
Agis II, King (c.427–401/400 BC)
Agesilaus II, King (c.401/400–360 BC)
Archidamus III, King (c.360–338 BC)
Agis III, King (c.338–331 BC)
Eudamidas I, King (c.331–305 BC)
Archidamus IV, King (c.305–275 BC)
Agiad dynasty (complete list) –
Pausanias of Sparta, King (c.409-395 BC)
Agesipolis I, King (c.395–380 BC)
Cleombrotus I, King (c.380–371 BC)
Agesipolis II, King (c.371–369 BC)
Cleomenes II, King (c.369–309 BC)
Areus I, King (c.309–265 BC)

Europe: East

Dacia (complete list) –
Histrianorum, King (c.339 BC)
Cothelas, King (4th century BC)

Europe: South

Roman Republic (complete list) –

400 – Consular Tribunes: P. Licinius Calvus Esquilinus, P. Maelius Capitolinus, P. Manlius Vulso, Sp. Furius Medullinus, L. Titinius Pansa Saccus, L. Publilius Philo Vulscus
399 – Consular Tribunes: Cn. Genucius Augurinus, C. Duillius Longus, L. Atilius Priscus, M. Veturius Crassus Cicurinus, M. Pomponius Rufus, Volero Publilius Philo
398 – Consular Tribunes: L. Valerius Potitus, L. Furius Medullinus, M. Valerius Lactucinus Maximus, Q. Servilius Fidenas, M. Furius Camillus, Q. Sulpicius Camerinus Cornutus
397 – Consular Tribunes: L. Iulius Iullus, A. Postumius Albinus Regillensis, L. Furius Medullinus, P. Cornelius Maluginensis, L. Sergius Fidenas, A. Manlius Vulso Capitolinus
396 – Consular Tribunes: L. Titinius Pansa Saccus, Q. Manlius Vulso Capitolinus, P. Licinius Calvus Esquilinus, Cn. Genucius Augurinus, P. Maelius Capitolinus, L. Atilius Priscus
395 – Consular Tribunes: P. Cornelius Cossus, L. Furius Medullinus, P. Cornelius Scipio, Q. Servilius Fidenas, K. Fabius Ambustus, M. Valerius Lactucinus Maximus
394 – Consular Tribunes: M. Furius Camillus, L. Valerius Potitus Poplicola, L. Furius Medullinus, Sp. Postumius Albinus Regillensis, C. Aemilius Mamercinus, P. Cornelius Scipio
393
L. Valerius Potitus Poplicola, Consul
Ser. Cornelius Maluginensis, Consul
L. Lucretius Tricipitinus Flavus, Consul suffectus
Ser. Sulpicius Camerinus, Consul suffectus
392
L. Valerius Potitus Poplicola, Consul
M. Manlius Capitolinus, Consul
391 – Consular Tribunes: L. Lucretius Tricipitinus Flavus, L. Furius Medullinus, Ser. Sulpicius Camerinus, Agrippa Furius Fusus, L. Aemilius Mamercinus, C. Aemilius Mamercinus
390 – Consular Tribunes: Q. Fabius Ambustus, Q. Sulpicius Longus, K. Fabius Ambustus, Q. Servilius Fidenas, N. Fabius Ambustus, P. Cornelius Maluginensis
389 – Consular Tribunes: L. Valerius Potitus Poplicola, A. Manlius Capitolinus, L. Verginius Tricostus Esquilinus (II?), L. Aemilius Mamercinus, P. Cornelius, L. Postumius Albinus Regillensis
388 – Consular Tribunes: T. Quinctius Cincinnatus Capitolinus, Q. Servilius Fidenas, L. Iulius Iullus, L. Aquillius Corvus, L. Lucretius Tricipitinus Flavus, Ser. Sulpicius Rufus
387 – Consular Tribunes: L. Papirius Cursor, Cn. Sergius Fidenas Coxo, L. Aemilius Mamercinus, Licinus Menenius Lanatus, L. Valerius Potitus Poplicola
386 – Consular Tribunes: M. Furius Camillus, Ser. Cornelius Maluginensis, Q. Servilius Fidenas, L. Quinctius Cincinnatus, L. Horatius Pulvillus, P. Valerius Potitus Poplicola
385 – Consular Tribunes: A. Manlius Capitolinus, P. Cornelius, T. Quinctius (Cincinnatus?) Capitolinus, L. Papirius Cursor, L. Quinctius Capitolinus, Cn. Sergius Fidenas Coxo
384 – Consular Tribunes: Ser. Cornelius Maluginensis, P. Valerius Potitus Poplicola, M. Furius Camillus, Ser. Sulpicius Rufus, C. Papirius Crassus, T. Quinctius Cincinnatus Capitolinus
383 – Consular Tribunes: L. Valerius Potitus Poplicola, A. Manlius Capitolinus, Ser. Sulpicius Rufus, L. Lucretius Tricipitinus Flavus, L. Aemilius Mamercinus, M. Trebonius
382 – Consular Tribunes: Sp. Papirius Crassus, L. Papirius Mugillanus, Ser. Cornelius Maluginensis, Q. Servilius Fidenas, C. Sulpicius Camerinus, L. Aemilius Mamercinus V
381 – Consular Tribunes: M. Furius Camillus, A. Postumius Albinus Regillensis, L. Postumius Albinus Regillensis, L. Furius Medullinus, L. Lucretius Tricipitinus Flavus, M. Fabius Ambustus
380 – Consular Tribunes: L. Valerius Potitus Poplicola, P. Valerius Potitus Poplicola, Ser. Cornelius Maluginensis, Licinus Menenius Lanatus, C. Sulpicius Peticus, L. Aemilius Mamercinus, Cn. Sergius Fidenas Coxo, Ti. Papirius Crassus, L. Papirius Mugillanus 
379 – Consular Tribunes: P. Manlius Capitolinus, Cn. Manlius Vulso, L. Iulius Iullus, C. Sextilius, M. Albinius, L. Antistius, P. Trebonius, C. Erenucius?
378 – Consular Tribunes: Sp. Furius Medullinus, Q. Servillius Fidenas, Licinus Menenius Lanatus, P. Cloelius Siculus, M. Horatius Pulvillus, L. Geganius Macerinus
377 – Consular Tribunes: L. Aemilius Mamercinus, P. Valerius Potitus Poplicola, C. Veturius Crassus Cicurinus, Ser. Sulpicius Rufus or: Ser. Sulpicius Praetextatus, L. Quinctius Cincinnatus, C. Quinctius Cincinnatus
376 – Consular Tribunes: L. Papirius Mugillanus, Licinus Menenius Lanatus, Ser. Cornelius Maluginensis, Ser. Sulpicius Praetextatus

375–371: Elections vetoed by plebeian tribunes. 
370 – Consular Tribunes: A. Manlius Capitolinus, L. Furius Medullinus, Ser. Sulpicius Praetextatus, Ser. Cornelius Maluginensis, C. Valerius Potitus Volusus, P. Valerius Potitus Poplicola 
369 – Consular Tribunes: Q. Servilius Fidenas, C. Veturius Crassus Cicurinus, A. Cornelius Cossus, M. Cornelius Maluginensis, Q. Quinctius Cincinnatus, M. Fabius Ambustus
368 – Consular Tribunes: Ser. Cornelius Maluginensis, Ser. Sulpicius Praetextatus, Sp. Servilius Structus, T. Quinctius Cincinnatus Capitolinus, L. Papirius Crassus, L. Veturius Crassus Cicurinus
367 – Consular Tribunes: A. Cornelius Cossus, M. Cornelius Maluginensis, M. Geganius Macerinus, P. Manlius Capitolinus, L. Veturius Crassus Cicurinus, P. Valerius Potitus Poplicola
366
L. Aemilius Mamercinus, Consul
L. Sextius Sextinus Lateranus, Consul
365
L. Genucius Aventinensis, Consul
Q. Servilius Ahala, Consul
364
C. Sulpicius Peticus, Consul
C. Licinius Calvus, Consul
363
Cn. Genucius Aventinensis, Consul
L. Aemilius Mamercinus, Consul
362
Q. Servilius Ahala, Consul
L. Genucius Aventinensis, Consul
361
C. Licinius Stolo, Consul
C. Sulpicius Peticus, Consul
360
M. Fabius Ambustus, Consul
C. Poetelius Libo Visolus, Consul
359
M. Popillius Laenas, Consul
Cn. Manlius Capitolinus Imperiosus, Consul
358
C. Fabius Ambustus, Consul
C. Plautius Proculus, Consul
357
C. Marcius Rutilus, Consul
Cn. Manlius Capitolinus Imperiosus, Consul
356
M. Fabius Ambustus II, Consul
M. Popillius Laenas, Consul
355
C. Sulpicius Peticus, Consul
M. Valerius Poplicola, Consul
354
M. Fabius Ambustus III, Consul
T. Quinctius Pennus Capitolinus Crispinus, Consul
? M. Popillius Laenas, Consul
353
C. Sulpicius Peticus, Consul
M. Valerius Poplicola, Consul
352
P. Valerius Poplicola, Consul
C. Marcius Rutilus, Consul
351
C. Sulpicius Peticus, Consul
T. Quinctius Pennus Capitolinus Crispinus, Consul
350
M. Popillius Laenas, Consul
L. Cornelius Scipio, Consul
349
L. Furius Camillus, Consul
Ap. Claudius Crassus Inregillensis, Consul
? M. Aemilius, Consul
? T. Quinctius, Consul
348
M. Valerius Corvus, Consul
M. Popillius Laenas, Consul
347
C. Plautius Venno (or Venox), Consul
T. Manlius Imperiosus Torquatus, Consul
346
M. Valerius Corvus, Consul
C. Poetelius Libo Visolus, Consul
345
M. Fabius Dorsuo, Consul
Ser. Sulpicius Camerinus Rufus, Consul
344
C. Marcius Rutilus, Consul
T. Manlius Imperiosus Torquatus, Consul
343
M. Valerius Corvus, Consul
A. Cornelius Cossus Arvina, Consul
342
Q. Servilius Ahala, Consul
C. Marcius Rutilus, Consul
341
C. Plautius Venno (or Venox), Consul
L. Aemilius Mamercinus Privernas, Consul
340
T. Manlius Imperiosus Torquatus, Consul
P. Decius Mus, Consul
339
Ti. Aemilius Mamercinus, Consul
Q. Publilius Philo, Consul
338
L. Furius Camillus, Consul
C. Maenius, Consul

337
C. Sulpicius Longus, Consul
P. Aelius Paetus, Consul
336
L. Papirius Crassus, Consul
K. Duillius, Consul
335
M. Atilius Regulus Calenus, Consul
M. Valerius Corvus, Consul
334
Sp. Postumius Albinus Caudinus, Consul
T. Veturius Calvinus, Consul
333
Publius Cornelius Rufinus, Dictator (333 BC)
332
Cn. Domitius Calvinus, Consul
A. Cornelius Cossus Arvina, Consul
331
C. Valerius Potitus, Consul
M. Claudius Marcellus, Consul
330
L. Papirius Crassus, Consul
L. Plautius Venno (or Venox), Consul
329
L. Aemilius Mamercinus Privernas, Consul
C. Plautius Decianus, Consul
328
P. Plautius Proculus or C. Plautius Decianus II, Consul
P. Cornelius Scapula or P. Cornelius Scipio Barbatus, Consul
327
L. Cornelius Lentulus, Consul
Q. Publilius Philo, Consul
326
C. Poetelius Libo Visolus, Consul
L. Papirius Cursor, Consul
325
L. Furius Camillus, Consul
D. Junius Brutus Scaeva, Consul
324
Lucius Papirius Cursor, Dictator (325–324 BC)
323
C. Sulpicius Longus, Consul
Q. Aulius Cerretanus, Consul
322
Q. Fabius Maximus Rullianus, Consul
L. Fulvius Curvus, Consul
321
T. Veturius Calvinus, Consul
Sp. Postumius Albinus Caudinus, Consul
320
L. Papirius Cursor, Consul
Q. Publilius Philo, Consul
319
L. Papirius Cursor, Consul
Q. Aulius Cerretanus, Consul
318
M. Folius Flaccinator, Consul
L. Plautius Venno (or Venox), Consul
317
C. Junius Bubulcus Brutus, Consul
Q. Aemilius Barbula, Consul
316
Sp. Nautius Rutilus, Consul
M. Popillius Laenas, Consul
315
L. Papirius Cursor, Consul
Q. Publilius Philo, Consul
314
M. Poetelius Libo, Consul
C. Sulpicius Longus, Consul
313
L. Papirius Cursor, Consul
C. Junius Bubulcus Brutus, Consul
312
M. Valerius Maximus Corvus, Consul
P. Decius Mus, Consul
311
C. Junius Bubulcus Brutus, Consul
Q. Aemilius Barbula II, Consul
310
Q. Fabius Maximus Rullianus, Consul
C. Marcius Rutilus Censorinus, Consul
309
L. Papirius Cursor, Dictator (310–309 BC)
308
P. Decius Mus, Consul
Q. Fabius Maximus Rullianus, Consul
307
Ap. Claudius Caecus, Consul
L. Volumnius Flamma Violens, Consul
306
Q. Marcius Tremulus, Consul
P. Cornelius Arvina, Consul
305
L. Postumius Megellus, Consul
Ti. Minucius Augurinus, Consul
M. Fulvius Curvus Paetinus, Consul suffectus
304
P. Sempronius Sophus, Consul
P. Sulpicius Saverrio, Consul
303
Ser. Cornelius Lentulus, Consul
L. Genucius Aventinensis, Consul
302
M. Livius Denter, Consul
M. Aemilius Paullus, Consul
301
 Marcus Valerius Corvus, Dictator (302, 301 BC)

Syracuse (complete list) –
Dionysius the Elder, Tyrant (405–367 BC)
Dionysius the Younger, Tyrant (367–356 BC, 346–344 BC)
Dion, Tyrant (357–355 BC)
Calippus, Tyrant (355–353 BC)
, Tyrant (353–c.350 BC)
, Tyrant (c.350–346 BC)
Timoleon, General, oligarch (345–337 BC)
Agathocles, Tyrant (317–289 BC)

Eurasia: Caucasus

Kingdom of Armenia (complete list) –
Orontes I, Satrap (401–344 BC)
Darius III, Satrap (c.344–336 BC)
Orontes II, Satrap (336–331 BC)
Mithrenes, Satrap (331–323 BC)
Neoptolemus, Satrap (323–321 BC)
Mithrenes, King (321–317 BC)
Orontes III, King (317–260 BC)

References

State Leaders
-
4th-century BC rulers